The 2012 FIFRA Club Championship is an indoor soccer tournament that included teams from four countries and four professional leagues. Teams from United States, Canada, Mexico and Ecuador compete for FIFRA Club Championship.

Standings

 
Blue indicates 2012 FIFRA Club Championship winner
Green indicates second place of 2012 FIFRA Club Championship
Orange indicates third place of 2012 FIFRA Club Championship

Games (All in Monterrey, Mexico)

First round
 2/2 - La Bombonerita 4, Sherbrooke Vert et Or 0
 2/2 - San Diego Sockers 5, Flash de Monterrey 4
 2/3 - San Diego Sockers 15, Sherbrooke Vert et Or 0
 2/3 - Flash de Monterrey 4, La Bombonerita 1
 2/4 - San Diego Sockers  8, La Bombonerita 3
 2/4 - Flash de Monterrey 5,  Sherbrooke Vert et Or 1

3rd-place game
 2/5 - La Bombonerita 7, Sherbrooke Vert et Or 6

Championship
 2/5 - San Diego Sockers 5, Flash de Monterrey 3

References

2012 in American soccer
2012 in Mexican sports
2012 in Ecuadorian sport
2012 in Canadian soccer